John Owen may refer to:

Sports
John Owen (footballer) (1849–1921), English footballer and educator
John Owen (athlete) (1861–1924), American sprinter
Johnny Owen (1956–1980), Welsh boxer
John Owen (cricketer) (born 1971), English cricketer

Religious figures
John Owen (bishop of St Asaph) (1580–1651), Bishop of St Asaph, Wales
John Owen (theologian) (1616–1683), English Nonconformist church leader and theologian
John Owen (dean of Clonmacnoise) (1686–1760), Irish Anglican priest
John Owen (chancellor of Bangor) (1698–1755), Welsh priest and opponent of Methodism
John Owen (archdeacon of Richmond) (1754–1824), Archdeacon of Richmond and Chaplain General of the British Armed Forces
John Owen (1766–1822), English Anglican cleric and secretary of the British and Foreign Bible Society
John Owen (chess player) (1827–1901), English vicar and amateur chess player
John Owen (bishop of St David's) (1854–1926), Bishop of St David's, Principal of St David's College, Lampeter

Politicians
John Owen (theologian) (1616–1683), English religious leader and MP for Oxford University
John Owen (MP for Caernarvon Boroughs), see Caernarvon Boroughs
John Lewis Owen, MP for Merioneth
John Owen (MP for Anglesey and Beaumaris) (died 1754), Welsh politician, represented Anglesey and Beaumaris in Parliament
Sir John Owen, 1st Baronet (1776–1861), Member of Parliament for Pembroke, 1841–1861
John Owen (North Carolina politician) (1787–1841), Democratic governor of North Carolina from 1828 to 1830
John J. Owen (1859–1933), member of the Virginia Senate

Others
John Dyfnallt Owen (1873–1956), poet and Archdruid
John Glendwr Owen (1914–1977), British civil servant
John H. Owen (1922–2011), president of the University of North Georgia and U.S. Navy officer

John Owen (author) (1952–2001), dramatist and director
John Owen (epigrammatist) (c. 1564–1622), Welsh epigrammatist
John Owen (judge), British barrister, High Court judge, and ecclesiastical judge
John Owen (Owain Alaw) (1821–1883), Welsh musician and composer

John Owen (Royal Marines officer) (1777–1857)
John Owen (Royalist) (1600–1666), Welsh Royalist officer during the English Civil War
John Simpson Owen (1912–95), Ugandan-born British conservationist
John Owen (Formula One), British Formula One engineer
SS John Owen, a Liberty ship

See also 
Johnny Owen (Nebraska politician) (1907–1978), member of the Nebraska House of Representatives
John Owen-Jones (born 1971), Welsh theatre actor
Jon Owen, American luger
Jon Owen Jones (born 1954), Welsh politician
Jonny Owen (born 1971), Welsh actor
Jack Owen (disambiguation)
John Owens (disambiguation)